Fibroblast growth factor 22 is a protein which in humans is encoded by the FGF22 gene.

Function
The protein encoded by this gene is a member of the fibroblast growth factor (FGF) family. FGF family members possess broad mitogenic and cell survival activities, and are involved in a variety of biological processes, including embryonic development, cell growth, morphogenesis, tissue repair, tumor growth and invasion. The mouse homolog of this gene was found to be preferentially expressed in the inner root sheath of the hair follicle, which suggested a role in hair development.

References